To Drink from the Night Itself is the sixth studio album by Swedish melodic death metal band At the Gates, released on 18 May 2018 via Century Media. The album is the first to feature guitarist Jonas Stålhammar and the first without co-founding guitarist Anders Björler, who had departed from the band in March 2017.

Critical reception

Upon its release, To Drink from the Night Itself received generally favorable reviews from critics. At Metacritic, which assigns a normalized rating out of 100 to reviews from mainstream publications, the album received an average score of 78 based on 6 reviews.

Accolades

Track listing

Personnel

At the Gates
 Tomas Lindberg – lead vocals
 Martin Larsson – guitars, acoustic guitar
 Jonas Stålhammar – lead guitar, Mellotron, backing vocals
 Jonas Björler – bass, keyboards, acoustic guitar, backing vocals
 Adrian Erlandsson – drums

Additional musicians
 Andy LaRocque – guitar solo 
 Rob Miller – vocals 
 Per Boder – vocals 
 Mikael Nox Pettersson – vocals 
 Rajmund Follmann – cello
 Peter Nitsche – double bass
 Tony Larsson – violin

Production
 Russ Russell – producer, recording, mixing, mastering
 Tomas Lindberg – producer
 Jonas Björler – producer
 Per Stålberg – recording 
 Olle Björk – recording 
 Martin Jacobson – recording 
 Costin Chioreanu – artwork, layout
 Ester Segarra – photography
 Patric Ullaeus – music video

Charts

References

2018 albums
At the Gates albums
Century Media Records albums